Øyvind Skarbø (born 9 April 1982 in Norway) is a Norwegian drummer and composer, raised in Stranda, and now residing in Bergen.

Biography 

Skarbø studied under the guidance of Terje Isungset at Griegakademiet, and has also carried out studies in Norwegian, Cuban and Nigerian traditional music. He is a driving force on the Norwegian improvisation music scene, both as a member and organizer of a number of bands. His main project '1982' and 'Bly de Blyant' are albums released on the Norwegian label Hubro.  He has received great recognition in the international press in addition to the 2016 Vossajazz Award. Skarbø has directed 'Øyvind Jazzforum', a concert series of improvised music, since 2006.

Honors 
2016: The Vossajazz Award

Discography

Solo albums 
2011: Die, Allround Handwerker! (+3 dB SUB)

Collaborations 
With 'Klangkameratane', including Even Helte Hermansen and Øyvind Hegg-Lunde
2007: Klangkameratane (Øyvind Jazzforum)

With '1982', including Sigbjørn Apeland and Nils Økland
2009: 1982 (NorCD)
2011: Pintura (Hubro)
2012: 1982 + BJ Cole (Hubro)
2014: A/B (Hubro)

With 'Stian Around A Hill', including Ola Høyer, Stian Omenås and Svein Magnus Furu
2009: Lille Stille (AIM Sound City)
2011: Alle Skal Få (Atterklang)

With 'BMX', including Njål Ølnes, Per Jørgensen and Thomas T. Dahl
2010: Bergen Open (NorCD)
2014: Rozel Point (Øyvind Jazzforum)

With 'Bly de Blyant', including Hilmar Jensson and Shahzad Ismaily
2013: ABC (Hubro)
2014: Hindsight Bias (Hubro)
2015: The Third Bly De Blyant Album (Hubro)

With 'Honeyleap', including Fredrik Ljungkvist, Klas Nevrin and Per Zanussi
2013: Honeyleap (Øyvind Jazzforum)

With 'Crab Is Crap', including Øyvind Hegg-Lunde
2015: Miradouro (Playdate Records), featuring Ståle Storløkken

With Håkon Kornstad
2015: Tenor Battle (Jazzland Recordings)

References

External links 

20th-century Norwegian drummers
21st-century Norwegian drummers
Norwegian jazz drummers
Male drummers
Norwegian jazz composers
Grieg Academy alumni
University of Bergen alumni
People from Stranda
1982 births
Living people
20th-century drummers
Male jazz composers
20th-century Norwegian male musicians
21st-century Norwegian male musicians
NorCD artists
Clean Feed Records artists